Kamthi Assembly constituency, also spelled Kamathi or Kamptee, is one of the twelve constituencies of the Maharashtra Vidhan Sabha located in the Nagpur district.

It is a part of the Ramtek (Lok Sabha constituency) (SC) from Nagpur district since 2009. It used to be part of Nagpur Lok Sabha seat until 2008.

Members of Legislative Assembly

Elections Result 2019

See also
Kamthi

References

Assembly constituencies of Nagpur district
Assembly constituencies of Maharashtra